Berislăvești is a commune in Vâlcea County, Romania. It is composed of seven villages: Berislăvești, Brădișor, Dângești, Rădăcinești, Robaia, Scăueni and Stoenești. It is situated in the historical region of Muntenia.

References

External links

Communes in Vâlcea County
Localities in Muntenia